Lappodiamesa is a genus of non-biting midges in the subfamily Diamesinae of the bloodworm family Chironomidae.

Species
The genus includes the following species:

 L. multiseta Makarchenko, 1995
 L. vidua (Kieffer, 1922)
 L. willasseni Makarchenko et Kerkis, 1991

References

Chironomidae